Chimaericolidae is a family of monogenean parasites. The family was named by Brinkmann in 1942.

Species of Chimaericolidae are parasites of Chimaeras.

Genera
According to the World Register of Marine Species, only two genera are included in the family:
 Callorhynchicola Brinkmann, 1952 
 Chimaericola Brinkmann, 1942

References

Polyopisthocotylea
Platyhelminthes families